The Capitol Hills Open was a golf tournament held in the Philippines in February/March 1964. The event was on the Far East Circuit.

Tomoo Ishii and Peter Thomson were tied for the lead entering the final round at 211 (−2). Ishii shot a final round 69 (−2) and won by two over Filipino Ben Arda. Celestino Tugot, also of the Philippines, was a further shot back at 283 (−1). He was the only other player to finish under par. Thomson faltered with a final round 73 and finished solo fourth at 284 (E).

Amateurs Hsieh Min-Nan and Kuo Chie-Hsiung, both of Taiwan, finished tied at 296 (+12). To determine the amateur champion there was a sudden-death playoff. Hsieh won at the first hole.

Winners

References

Asia Golf Circuit events
Golf tournaments in the Philippines